Juncus conglomeratus, known commonly as compact rush, is a perennial, herbaceous flowering plant species in the rush family Juncaceae.

In the British Isles it is one of six rush species that can dominate lowland damp grasslands.

References

conglomeratus
Plants described in 1753
Taxa named by Carl Linnaeus